Robert Lowry Scott (born 17 June 1951), is the Lord Lieutenant of County Tyrone.

References

1951 births
Lord-Lieutenants of Tyrone
Living people